De Martino (also styled de Martino or DeMartino) is an Italian surname. Notable people with the surname include:

De Martino
Alberto De Martino (1929–2015), Italian film director and screenwriter
Angelo de Martino ( Angelo De Martini; 1897–1979), Italian racing cyclist and Olympic medalist
Antonio De Martino (1815–1904), Italian physician, researcher, and politician
Daniela De Martino, Australian politician
Edoardo De Martino (1838–1912), Italian-born British painter
Ernesto de Martino (1908–1965), Italian anthropologist, philosopher, and historian of religion
Francesco De Martino (1907–2002), Italian jurist and politician; father of Guido De Martino
Giacomo De Martino (1868–1957), Swiss-born Italian diplomat and politician
Giacomo De Martino (governor) (1849–1921), British-born Italian politician and colonial governor
Giovanni de Martino (1870–1935), Italian sculptor
Guido De Martino (born 1943), Italian politician; son of Francesco De Martino
Íñigo de Martino (1905–2006), Mexican screenwriter and film director
Jules De Martino (born 1967), British musician; member of the pop duo The Ting Tings
Pietro De Martino (1707–1746), Italian mathematician and astronomer
Raffaele De Martino (born 1986), Italian footballer
Tino De Martino ( Tino DeMartino; born ?), Belgian bass guitarist for Channel Zero (band)

DeMartino
Gabi DeMartino [see: Niki and Gabi] (born 1995), American singer, actor, producer, and writer; twin sister of Niki DeMartino
Nick DeMartino (born 1948), American business executive
Niki DeMartino [see: Niki and Gabi] (born 1995), American actor, producer, and writer; twin sister of Gabi DeMartino
Rich DeMartino (born 1939), American contract bridge player
Tino DeMartino ( Tino De Martino; born ?), Belgian bass guitarist for Channel Zero (band)

In Fiction
Anthony DeMartino, character featured in MTV's animated series Daria (1997–2002)

See also
Di Martino (surname)
Martino (disambiguation)

Italian-language surnames
Patronymic surnames
Surnames from given names